Abdul Bilal "Bill" Hamid (born November 25, 1990) is an American professional soccer player who plays as a goalkeeper for Memphis 901 FC in USL Championship.

Born in Annandale, Virginia, Hamid was the first D.C. United Academy player to sign for the first team in September 2009. He made his professional debut in May 2010 as the youngest goalkeeper to win a game in Major League Soccer history. Hamid totalled 200 games for D.C. United, including 184 in the league. He helped the team to victory in the 2013 U.S. Open Cup and received the MLS Goalkeeper of the Year Award in 2014. In January 2018 he joined FC Midtjylland, winning the Danish Superliga in his first season.

Hamid made his senior debut for the United States national team in January 2012. He was part of their teams that won the CONCACAF Gold Cup in 2013 and 2017.

Club career

D.C. United
Hamid became the first D.C. United Academy player to sign with the first team on September 2, 2009. Prior to signing with D.C. United, he was linked with a move to Celtic, until work permit issues derailed the move.

He made his professional debut on May 5, 2010 in a game against the Kansas City Wizards.  With this win, Hamid became the youngest goalkeeper in MLS history, at 19 years 161 days, to win a regular season game, besting Tim Howard's record by four days. Hamid started 28 of United's 34 games during the 2011 season. He retained his starting spot during the 2012 season, making appearances in 27 matches.

After the 2011 regular season, Hamid began a 10-day trial on October 29, 2011 with English Premier League club West Bromwich Albion. He stayed with the club until November 7.

In 2012, Hamid earned a record 88 saves in arguably his best season in MLS to date. Despite Hamid being sent off with a red card during the 2012 playoffs in a match against the New York Red Bulls, D.C. United was able to come away with a win and advance to the next round. Hamid, emotional after seeing the win, was videotaped shirtless screaming "You can't hold us back" while pounding his chest. The phrase became a rallying cry for D.C. United fans who organized a display featuring the quote. Although D.C. United failed to defeat their next challenger, the Houston Dynamo, the phrase stuck with the fans. For the 2013 season, the D.C. United fan group Screaming Eagles designed a scarf with the quote and presented Hamid with a free one. D.C. United won the 2013 Lamar Hunt U.S. Open Cup, the 100th edition of the competition. Hamid played the final, a 1–0 win at Real Salt Lake, having been deputized by Joe Willis in previous rounds.
In 2014, D.C. United finished top of the Eastern Conference in the regular season, having finished bottom the year before. Hamid won the MLS Goalkeeper of the Year Award.

FC Midtjylland
At the end of the 2017 season, Hamid’s contract with D.C. United expired as the two sides failed to negotiate a new contract. On October 25, 2017, it was announced that Hamid had signed with Danish Superliga club FC Midtjylland valid from January 1, 2018. He was back-up to Jesper Hansen in his first season, making only one league appearance on April 22 in a 3–3 draw at Aalborg, in which he made a mistake from a corner kick to give the opponents a 3–2 lead. Midtjylland finished the campaign as league champions.

Return to D.C. United
Hamid rejoined D.C. United on August 8, 2018, on a year-and-a-half loan. On December 9, 2019, this was made into a three-year permanent transfer for a reported transfer fee of $750,000.

Memphis 901
On March 20, 2023, Hamid joined USL Championship club Memphis 901 for the 2023 season.

International career

United States
Hamid played for the United States at under-18 and under-20 level, and in October 2009 he trained with the senior team. Hamid made his international debut for U.S. national team on January 21, 2012, keeping a shutout as his team beat Venezuela 1–0 in an exhibition game at the University of Phoenix Stadium. He became the ninth goalkeeper not to concede on his international debut for the United States.

Coach Jürgen Klinsmann named Hamid in his roster for the 2013 CONCACAF Gold Cup, which the United States won. He did not make his second appearance until November 18, 2014 in a 4–1 exhibition loss to the Republic of Ireland in Dublin.

Hamid was again called up for the 2017 CONCACAF Gold Cup, receiving a second winner's medal. On July 15, he played his first competitive match for the United States at FirstEnergy Stadium in Cleveland, Ohio and kept a shutout in a 3–0 win that made his team top their group.

On December 30, 2019, Hamid was called up to Gregg Berhalter's 25-man roster for a friendly against Costa Rica on February 1, 2020.

Sierra Leone
On March 21, 2022, Hamid was called up to Sierra Leone's 23-man roster for a friendlies against Togo, Liberia and Congo in March 2022.

Personal life
Hamid's parents are from Sierra Leone. He was raised Muslim and observes fasting during the Islamic month of Ramadan. He graduated from DeMatha Catholic High School in Hyattsville, Maryland in 2006.

Career statistics

Club

International

Honors
D.C. United
U.S. Open Cup: 2013

Midtjylland
Danish Superliga: 2017–18

United States
CONCACAF Gold Cup: 2013, 2017

Individual
MLS Goalkeeper of the Year: 2014

References

External links

 
 

1990 births
Living people
Soccer players from Virginia
People from Annandale, Virginia
American soccer players
African-American soccer players
Association football goalkeepers
DeMatha Catholic High School alumni
D.C. United players
Major League Soccer players
Major League Soccer All-Stars
FC Midtjylland players
Danish Superliga players
United States men's under-20 international soccer players
United States men's under-23 international soccer players
Memphis 901 FC players
USL Championship players
United States men's international soccer players
American people of Sierra Leonean descent
2013 CONCACAF Gold Cup players
2017 CONCACAF Gold Cup players
CONCACAF Gold Cup-winning players
Sportspeople from Fairfax County, Virginia
African-American Muslims
American expatriate soccer players
Expatriate men's footballers in Denmark
American expatriate sportspeople in Denmark
Homegrown Players (MLS)
21st-century African-American sportspeople